Altamirano may refer to:

Places

In Argentina
Altamirano, Buenos Aires

In Mexico
Altamirano Municipality, Chiapas
Altamirano, Chiapas, a town and the municipal seat of the above
Altamirano, Chihuahua
Altamirano (Rancho Altamirano), Chihuahua
Altamirano, Guanajuato
Altamirano, Quintana Roo
Altamirano, Tamaulipas
Ciudad Altamirano, Guerrero
Ciudad Altamirano, Michoacán
Manlio Fabio Altamirano, Veracruz, also called Altamirano
San Agustín Altamirano, Mexico State, also called Altamirano

Other uses
Altamirano (surname)